The Louis Blotner Radar Site was a tracking site site (Not an RBS site) in Connor, Maine at the former NIKE missile launch site. Activated in June 1963 and operational until after 1979, The Ashland site was an AUTOTRACK radar site operated by Detachment 7 of the 1st Combat Evaluation Group. The station simulated Electronic Countermeasures and Radar Bomb Scoring for the Ashland Training Range's low-level training route "over Bangor north to Houlton, Maine.

History
The site was constructed at a former 1957 NIKE battery control area (radar site) which, had been conveyed to Blotner Trailer Sales in 1962, the SAC radar station was initially a mobile site with temporarily-emplaced systems. In 1975, the site was planned to become permanent, but instead groundbreaking in June 1979 was for the nearby Ashland Radar Station. The "Blotner Site" was subsequently used for Louis Blotner Communications Facility No. 1 of Det 2, 1000 SOG in 1987-1993, and the enlisted men's barracks operated as a general store in August 1992.  In 1996 the former Ashland site was planned for civilian transfer.

References

External links
Article on closure of the station

Military installations in Maine
Formerly Used Defense Sites
Buildings and structures in Aroostook County, Maine
Strategic Air Command radar stations
United States automatic tracking radar stations
Loring Air Force Base
Military installations established in 1963
Military installations closed in 1980
1963 establishments in Maine
1980 disestablishments in Maine